Terry Wayne Allen (born June 11, 1959) is an American retired professional wrestler, better known by his ring name, Magnum T. A. Allen won the NWA United States Heavyweight Championship twice and was being groomed for a potential run with the NWA World Heavyweight Championship but a car crash in 1986 forced him into retirement. After retiring, Magnum T. A. continued to appear in non-wrestling roles for multiple promotions.

Professional wrestling career

Early career (1978–1984)
Allen started wrestling in 1978 and joined the National Wrestling Alliance (NWA), where he began competing for the Championship Wrestling from Florida and the Pacific Northwest Wrestling (PNW) territories. While in the CWF, Allen won the Global Tag Team Championship on five occasions before then moving to Mid-South Wrestling. Upon debuting in Mid-South, Allen renamed himself "Magnum T. A." and adopted a character known as the "American Heart Throb", based on Allen's slight resemblance to actor Tom Selleck, who at the time was starring in the popular television series Magnum, P.I.. Allen adopted the ring name after André the Giant suggested that he combine the Magnum name with the initials of his real name. After competing in Mid-South, he won the North American Heavyweight Championship, his first major title, after defeating Mr. Wrestling II on May 13, 1984. Magnum would hold the title for five months before he lost it to the "Cat" Ernie Ladd on October 16. On November 22, Magnum lost to Ladd via disqualification in a title rematch.

Jim Crockett Promotions (1984–1986)
In 1984, the National Wrestling Alliance's Jim Crockett Promotions signed Allen. After debuting, Magnum began feuding with Wahoo McDaniel and defeated him for the United States Heavyweight Championship on March 23, 1985. At The Great American Bash, he successfully defended the title by defeating Kamala. He then began feuding with the Four Horsemen before feuding solely with Horsemen member Tully Blanchard and his valet Baby Doll, losing the title to him on July 21. On September 28, Magnum lost to the Horsemen's leader Ric Flair in a nearly 30-minute title match for Flair's World Heavyweight Championship. Magnum would regain the U.S. title in the famous "I Quit" match at Starrcade on November 28.

In April 1986, Magnum began feuding with Ivan Koloff, who had started proclaiming that his nephew, Nikita, would become the United States Heavyweight Champion. Jim Crockett, Jr. set up a contract signing for Magnum to defend his title against Nikita in May. At the signing, Magnum brought his mother, Marion, while Nikita brought Ivan. However, Nikita insulted Magnum's mother during the signing, instigating a fight. Then-president of the NWA, Bob Geigel, issued a public reprimand against Magnum for "conduct unbecoming a champion." Magnum replied, "Reprimand this!" while punching Geigel. As a result, Magnum was stripped of his title and it was put up in a best of seven series between Magnum and Nikita. After losing the first three matches in a row to Nikita, Magnum began a comeback, winning the next three matches to keep the series going. In the tie-breaking match on August 17, 1986, in Charlotte, North Carolina, Nikita defeated Magnum to win the title with help from Ivan and Krusher Khruschev.

Car crash and retirement
On October 14, 1986, Allen was driving in his Porsche in the rain and lost control, wrapping the car around a telephone pole. The wreck happened on Sardis Road in Charlotte, North Carolina, only a couple of miles from his home. Initially, investigators believed he was speeding, but forensic reports showed he was driving the speed limit and he was left in his car for two hours before a witness called 911. The wreck caused his C-4 and C-5 vertebrae to "explode", and it was doubted at the time whether he would ever walk again. Doctors at Carolinas Medical Center said Allen's physical conditioning saved his life. The right side of his body was paralyzed for months, ending his in-ring career. Losing Allen as a wrestler prompted NWA booker Dusty Rhodes to turn Nikita Koloff, Allen's last rival prior to his wreck, into a babyface. According to the storyline, Koloff gained respect for Magnum from their feud and wanted to take his place. This was memorialized in the spring edition of the Wrestling '87 magazine, with a large photograph of Koloff with the words "I cry for Magnum T.A." beside him. Prior to his wreck, Magnum was to win the U.S. Title for the third time before being groomed to become the NWA World Heavyweight Champion. Magnum's first on-screen appearance following the wreck was on TBS's Super Towns on the Superstation, in an interview with Tony Schiavone. His first appearance in front of a live crowd was at the Crockett Cup in 1987, where, with the aid of a cane and two referees, Magnum walked to ringside to embrace Dusty and Nikita, who would go on to defeat Tully Blanchard and Lex Luger for the tournament championship.  Magnum (as "The Boss" Magnum T. A.) hosted an interview segment titled Straight Talk with The Boss on NWA World Wide Wrestling in 1988.

Magnum later worked as a commentator for the NWA, UWF, and World Championship Wrestling (WCW), and also served as a manager for Rhodes and Koloff. In his last angle in WCW in March 1988, Magnum was attacked by his former rival Tully Blanchard, which prompted Dusty Rhodes to come to the aid of his friend. Rhodes was subsequently suspended and returned as The Midnight Rider, managed by Magnum. After Rhodes signed with Championship Wrestling from Florida and later the World Wrestling Federation (WWF), and Koloff signed with the American Wrestling Association (AWA), Magnum left JCP as well, although he would make sporadic reappearances with the promotion until 1993 at Slamboree.

On May 20, 1995, Allen appeared as part of a legends recognition at Smoky Mountain Wrestling's "Carolina Memories" show in Charlotte. On January 14, 2005, Allen made an appearance as a guest at the Exodus Wrestling Alliance. He would later appear for the Carolina Wrestling Association in the corner of Jason Jones during Jones' loss to George South, Jr. on May 21. At the event Tribute To Starrcade on November 19, Magnum stood in Rhodes' corner as he lost to Tully Blanchard. On June 24, 2007, Allen, as Magnum T. A., made his first appearance for World Wrestling Entertainment at their Vengeance: Night of Champions pay-per-view, where he was noted as a former United States Champion.

Personal life
Allen attended high school at Norfolk Collegiate School in Norfolk, Virginia. He was a member of the collegiate wrestling team and won the state championship in the 167-pound division. After graduating high school, he attended Old Dominion University. 

Allen is stepfather to Tessa Blanchard, who moved in with him and her siblings and her mother Courtney Shattuck at age 4. He works as a manager at a network-solutions company and resides in Charlotte.

Championships and accomplishments
Championship Wrestling from Florida
NWA Florida Global Tag Team Championship (5 times) – with Scott McGhee (3), Dusty Rhodes (1), and Brad Armstrong (1)
George Tragos/Lou Thesz Professional Wrestling Hall of Fame
Lou Thesz World Heavyweight Championship Award (2017)
Jim Crockett Promotions
NWA United States Heavyweight Championship (2 times)
Mid-South Wrestling
Mid-South North American Championship (2 times)
Mid-South Tag Team Championship (2 times) – with Jim Duggan (1) and Mr. Wrestling II (1)
Pro Wrestling Illustrated
Ranked No. 73 of the 500 best singles wrestlers of the "PWI Years" in 2003
Professional Wrestling Hall of Fame and Museum
Class of 2020

References

External links

 

1959 births
American Christians
American male professional wrestlers
Living people
NWA/WCW/WWE United States Heavyweight Champions
Professional wrestlers from Virginia
Professional wrestling announcers
Professional Wrestling Hall of Fame and Museum
Professional wrestling managers and valets
Sportspeople from Chesapeake, Virginia
20th-century professional wrestlers
NWA Florida Global Tag Team Champions